Movement for the Unity of the Communists (in Portuguese: Movimento pela Unidade dos Comunistas) was a splinter group of the Brazilian Communist Party (PCB). MUC split from PCB on April 19, 2005, after the departure of PCB from the Lula government. On May 15 the same year, the 53 members of MUC decided to merge into the Communist Party of Brazil (PCdoB).

The national coordinators of MUC were Daniel Vieira Sebastiani, Bruno Barbosa and Charles Santos Martins.

External links 
 Article about MUC in Vermelho

2005 establishments in Brazil
Communist parties in Brazil
Defunct political parties in Brazil
Political parties established in 2005